Felix Passlack (born 29 May 1998) is a German professional footballer who plays as a right-back for Bundesliga club Borussia Dortmund.

Club career

Borussia Dortmund
On 2 March 2016, Passlack made his professional debut in the Bundesliga in a 2–0 win against Darmstadt 98. He also played in a 3–1 win against FC Augsburg and a 3–0 win during the 2015–16 season.

TSG 1899 Hoffenheim
On 30 August 2017, Passlack extended his contract with Borussia Dortmund and was loaned out to Hoffenheim for two years. The loan spell at Hoffenheim was terminated early in July 2018.

Norwich City
On 2 July 2018, Passlack signed for Championship side Norwich City on a season-long loan. He only made one league appearance as Norwich were promoted to the Premier League as winners of the 2018–19 EFL Championship.

Fortuna Sittard 
On 2 July 2019, Passlack signed for Eredivisie side Fortuna Sittard on a season-long loan.

International career
In 2014, Passlack made six appearances for Germany at under-16 level and in the same year he debuted for the Germany U17 team. In May 2015, Passlack was selected to captain the Germany squad at the 2015 UEFA European Under-17 Championship in Bulgaria, he played every single minute of the tournament, scoring three goals and helping Germany reach the final where they lost 4–1 to France. In October 2015, Passlack captained Germany at the 2015 FIFA U-17 World Cup in Chile, appearing in all four of Germany's matches and scoring two goals as Germany were eliminated in the round of 16 in a 2–0 loss to Croatia. In total, Passlack has scored seven goals in 20 appearances for the Germany U17 team. In March 2016, Passlack was called up to the Germany U18 team for the first time and later that year, received his first call to the Germany U19 team.

Career statistics

Club

1.Includes DFB-Pokal, FA Cup and KNVB Cup.
2.Includes UEFA Champions League and UEFA Europa League.
3.Includes DFL-Supercup and EFL Cup.

Honours
Borussia Dortmund
DFB-Pokal: 2016–17

Germany U17
UEFA European Under-17 Championship runner-up: 2015

Individual
 Fritz Walter Medal U17 Gold: 2015
 2015 UEFA European Under-17 Championship Team of the Tournament

References

External links

Profile at the Borussia Dortmund website

1998 births
Living people
Footballers from North Rhine-Westphalia
German footballers
Germany youth international footballers
Germany under-21 international footballers
Association football midfielders
Borussia Dortmund players
TSG 1899 Hoffenheim players
Norwich City F.C. players
Bundesliga players
English Football League players
German expatriate footballers
Expatriate footballers in England
German expatriate sportspeople in England